Christos Marangos (Greek: Χρίστος Μαραγκός; born May 9, 1983) is a Cypriot retired professional footballer who played as a midfielder.

Career
He began his career in 2000, playing for Apollon Limassol and in his first season with his team he achieved to win the Cypriot Cup. He remained to Apollon until 2005, when he was transferred to Anorthosis Famagusta. After having a successful season with his team and playing in all the Championship matches for his team scoring two goals he caused the interest of the Greek team Aris and he transferred there in the summer of 2006. During the middle of the season, he returned to Anorthosis Famagusta. In June 2007 he signed once again for Apollon Limassol. On the 08/06/2009 the Cypriot player was transferred back to Anorthosis Famagusta and in June 2012 he moved to AEK Larnaca. Furthermore, in June 2013, he returned to Anorthosis Famagusta for the fourth time in his career.

International goals
Scores and results list Cyprus' goal tally first.

References

External links
 
 

1983 births
Living people
Cypriot footballers
Cyprus international footballers
Association football midfielders
Sportspeople from Limassol
Super League Greece players
Cypriot First Division players
Anorthosis Famagusta F.C. players
Apollon Limassol FC players
Aris Thessaloniki F.C. players
AEK Larnaca FC players
Cypriot expatriate footballers
Expatriate footballers in Greece
Cypriot expatriate sportspeople in Greece